Cassinia maritima commonly known as coast cassinia, is a species of flowering plant in the family Asteraceae and is endemic to coastal areas of south-eastern Australia. It is an erect shrub with glandular hairs embedded in a sticky layer on its branches and leaves, needle-shaped leaves, and white to yellowish heads of flowers arranged in a flat-topped corymb.

Description
The upper surface of the leaves is sticky, the edges rolled under and the lower surface densely hairy. The heads are arranged in groups of several hundred in a flat-topped corymb  in diameter.

Taxonomy and naming
Cassinia maritima was first formally described in 2004 by Anthony Edward Orchard in Australian Systematic Botany from specimens collected by near the Cann River in 2004. The specific epithet (maritima) means "growing by the sea".

Distribution and habitat
Coast cassinia grows in the shrub layer of scrub and forest in near-coastal areas from Eden in south-eastern New South Wales to far far north-eastern Victoria.

References

maritima
Asterales of Australia
Flora of New South Wales
Flora of Victoria (Australia)
Plants described in 2004